Vortex theory may refer to:
Mechanical explanations of gravitation
Vortex theory of the atom
History of knot theory
Insect flight#Leading edge vortex